The 2009–10 New York Islanders season was the 38th season in the National Hockey League (NHL) franchise's history. Following the trade of Bill Guerin during the 2008–09 season, the Islanders named center Doug Weight the team's new captain. Kyle Okposo, Richard Park, Mark Streit and Brendan Witt served as the team's alternate captains. The year opened with the 2009 NHL Entry Draft on June 26–27, with the Islanders using their first selection in the draft to select John Tavares.

Preseason 

Before the regular season began, the New York Islanders played a series of exhibition games. Only one game was held at Nassau Coliseum, in which the Islanders lost to the New Jersey Devils 2–4. Their first exhibition game was held on September 14, when the Islanders were defeated 2–1 by the Vancouver Canucks. The Islanders played two games at the place they held their training camp, the Credit Union Centre in Saskatoon, Saskatchewan. They won the two games held there, defeating the Flames on September 19 and the Oilers on September 20. As previously expected, the Islanders played one game in the new Sprint Center in Kansas City against the Los Angeles Kings, in which the Islanders lost 2–4. The team's final exhibition game was on September 29 against the Devils at the Prudential Center in Newark, where they again lost 2–4.

Forward Doug Weight is named team captain.

Regular season 

On July 15, 2009, the Islanders released their regular season schedule, in which the Islanders play a regular amount of 82 games, 41 home and 41 away. The team's first game was against the defending Stanley Cup champions, the Pittsburgh Penguins, on October 3, 2009, at Nassau Coliseum, in which the Islanders lost in a shootout, 4–3.

Divisional standings

Conference standings

Schedule and results

Playoffs 

The Islanders missed the playoffs for the second straight year.

Player statistics

Skaters 
Note: GP = Games played; G = Goals; A = Assists; Pts = Points; +/− = Plus/minus; PIM = Penalty minutes

Goaltenders 
Note: GP = Games played; TOI = Time on ice (minutes); W = Wins; L = Losses; OT = Overtime losses; GA = Goals against; GAA= Goals against average; SA= Shots against; SV= Saves; Sv% = Save percentage; SO= Shutouts

†Denotes player spent time with another team before joining Islanders. Stats reflect time with Islanders only.
‡Traded mid-season. Stats reflect time with Islanders only.

Awards and records

Awards

Records

Milestones

Transactions 
Before the 2009–10 season got underway, the Islanders were involved in many transactions, and signed and lost some free agents. Their first trade for the season was made at the 2009 NHL Entry Draft, where the New York Islanders sent four draft picks to the Columbus Blue Jackets in exchange for two draft picks (including a first round pick that allowed them move up ten spots from a previously acquired pick). The team would make another trade with the Blue Jackets later on in the draft. The Islanders also made a trade with the Minnesota Wild, which allowed them to move up four additional spots (to pick 12th) from the position they were in after their original trade with Columbus. They wound up using the pick to draft Calvin de Haan. In the third round, the Islanders traded a third round pick in the 2010 draft for the 62nd pick in the current draft. On June 30, 2009, the Islanders traded Ben Walter and a conditional pick in the 2010 draft to the New Jersey Devils for Tony Romano.

The Islanders signed many free agents as well, including veteran goalie Dwayne Roloson on July 1. The following day, the Islanders signed three other players: Scott Munroe, Brett Westgarth and Jeremy Reich. On July 6, the Islanders acquired four minor-league players, and lost two of their own (Chris Lee and Peter Mannino). Yann Danis and Joe Callahan both left the Islanders as well on July 10 and 16, respectively. The Islander last acquired was goaltender Martin Biron, who played the previous season for the Philadelphia Flyers.

The Islanders also signed their first overall draft pick from 2009, John Tavares, to a three-year, entry-level contract on July 15, and resigned Nate Thompson to a one-year, two-way contract on July 25.

Trades

Free agents acquired

Free agents lost

Lost via waivers

Players re-signed

Draft picks 

The Islanders held the first pick in the 2009 NHL Entry Draft, to be held in Montreal. On April 14, 2009, it was announced that the Islanders had won the 2009 NHL Draft Lottery and earned the first draft pick for the fourth time in the franchise's history. Going into the lottery, the Islanders held a 48.2% chance of winning the lottery, due to their coming in last place in the 2008–09 season. In addition to the first pick, the Islanders hold the 26th draft pick during the first round, acquiring it from the San Jose Sharks, and three second-round draft picks. Matt Duchene, Victor Hedman, Evander Kane, Brayden Schenn and John Tavares were the favorites to be drafted by the first five teams. General manager Garth Snow mentioned in an article on the Islanders' official website that Islanders management have scouted each of these players for years. Since the announcement about the Islanders picking first in the draft, their ticket sales department has seen a 300% increase in phone calls and email inquiries over last year at the same date.

During the draft, the Islanders selected center John Tavares as their first pick and also the first pick overall in the draft. After selecting Tavares, the Islanders made a trade with the Columbus Blue Jackets that sent the Islanders picks 26, 37, 62 and 92 (in 2009) to the Blue Jackets in exchange for picks 16 and 77 (in 2009). With this trade, the Islanders had moved up from pick 26 to pick 16 in the first round of the 2009 Draft. Following this, the Islanders made another trade, this time with the Minnesota Wild, giving Minnesota picks 16, 77 and 182 (in 2009) in exchange for pick 12 from Minnesota (in 2009). At this point, the Islanders had moved up from pick 26 to pick 12. With the 12th pick, the Islanders selected Calvin de Haan, a defenceman from the Oshawa Generals.

Farm teams

Bridgeport Sound Tigers 
The Islanders' American Hockey League affiliate will remain to be the Bridgeport Sound Tigers in the 2009–10 season.

Utah Grizzlies 
The Utah Grizzlies remain New York's ECHL affiliate for the 2009–10 season.

Odessa Jackalopes 
The Odessa Jackalopes remain New York's Central Hockey League affiliate for the 2009–10 season.

References 

 Player stats: 
 Game log: 
 Team standings:

External links 
 2009–10 New York Islanders season at ESPN
 2009–10 New York Islanders season at Hockey Reference

New York Islanders seasons
New York Islanders
New York Islanders
New York Islanders
New York Islanders